David Worthington (born 28 March 1945) is an English former professional football player and coach. Worthington, who played as a right back, made nearly 500 appearances in the Football League between 1961 and 1976.

Personal life
Born in Halifax, Worthington had two brothers who were also professional footballers – Bob and Frank.

His son Gary was also a professional footballer.

Career
Worthington made nearly 500 appearances in the Football League between 1961 and 1976 for Halifax Town, Barrow, Grimsby Town and Southend United. At Grimsby between 1966 and 1973, he made 293 appearances in the Football League, scoring 14 goals in the process. Worthington was part of the 1971–72 team that won the Division Four title.

Worthington later became player-manager of non-league Cambridge City. Worthington also had a brief spell as Halifax Town caretaker manager in 1999.

Worthington started scouting at Halifax Town, after they went into administration in 2002 he joined Neil Thompson at Boston United before being hired by Sam Allardyce at Bolton Wanderers in 2003. He was hired by Chelsea in 2007 before working in Portugal and Spain for Hull's former boss Phil Brown. He then rejoined Sam Allardyce, watching matches in the Spanish and French leagues to identify potential signings for Blackburn Rovers.

Worthington was crucial to some of Sam Allardyce's signings, spotting Abdoulaye Faye on loan at French side Istres who Bolton paid £750,000 and was later sold for £2-million. Worthington's biggest success was striker Nicolas Anelka, who he guided back to the Premier League to Bolton in 2006 from Fenerbahçe, "It was against everyone's view to sign Anelka," Worthington said. He also recommended his move to Chelsea two seasons later. "I tried to get Karim Benzema (now at Real Madrid) to Chelsea from Lyon when he was 18," Worthington said. "At Bolton, I also tracked Hugo Lloris (now a reigning Ligue 1 goalkeeper of the year at Lyon) at his hometown club Nice, and a young Samir Nasri – but Marseille wanted 12-million euros rather than our offer of three million."

Worthington currently lives in Spain as of August 2012, working as an international scout for Premier League side Sunderland.

Honours
Grimsby Town
Division Four: 1971–72

References

1945 births
Living people
English footballers
English football managers
Halifax Town A.F.C. players
Barrow A.F.C. players
Grimsby Town F.C. players
Southend United F.C. players
Cambridge City F.C. players
English Football League players
Halifax Town A.F.C. managers
Bolton Wanderers F.C. non-playing staff
Chelsea F.C. non-playing staff
Hull City A.F.C. non-playing staff
Blackburn Rovers F.C. non-playing staff
Sunderland A.F.C. non-playing staff
Association football defenders
Footballers from Halifax, West Yorkshire
Association football scouts